Lee Richards or Lee-Richards may refer to:

Lee Greene Richards, artist
Lee Richards, guitarist for Another Animal, Godsmack, and Dropbox
Lee-Richards annular monoplane
Lee-Richards molecular surface

See also
Lee Richard (disambiguation)
Richards (surname)